The Deputy Darcy Castelo de Mendonça Bridge, colloquially known as the Third Bridge (Portuguese: Terceira Ponte), is the second tallest bridge in Brazil, connecting the cities of Vila Velha and Vitória in the state of Espirito Santo.  Spanning the mouth of Vitória's bay, which has many other features, including the Penha Convent, Moreno's hill, freight ships, coastline, islands and modern buildings, the bridge has become one of Espirito Santo's main landmarks.

History

Construction and impact
Construction began on the bridge in 1978 and was completed and 11 years later on August 23, 1989.  The Third Bridge was so dubbed in reference to two older bridges between Vitória and Vila Velha:  Florentino Avidos Bridge, known as 'Five Bridges' ('Cinco Pontes'); and the Prince Bridge (Ponte do Príncipe), known as the 'Second Bridge'. It is now the main link between Vitória and the southern coast of Espirito Santo.  

After the Third Bridge was completed, Vila Velha, previously known as a sleepy seaside town, entered a period of intense civil development.

Traffic and maintenance
12 thousand vehicles a day crossed the bridge soon after its completion. Since then, the traffic has increased to 58 thousand cars. The bridge has a modern structure, which includes: lighting, signalling, mechanical assistance and emergency medical services. The operation of the Third Bridge is monitored by its Operational Control Center.  On December 21, 2003, aiming to enhance the image of the bridge and beautify the city, RodoSol, the company maintaining the bridge, installed blue fluorescent lamps on the central pillars of the third bridge.

Gallery

See also 
List of bridges by length

Bridges in Brazil
Buildings and structures in Espírito Santo
Transport in Espírito Santo
Toll bridges